Henry Edmondson (1872–1946) was an Australian rules footballer and cricketer.

Henry Edmondson or Edmundson may also refer to:

Henry Edmondson (educationalist) (1607–1659), English schoolmaster
Henry A. Edmundson (1814–1890), congressman and lawyer
Henry A. Edmondson (1833–1918), Confederate officer and Virginia state legislator